Miss World Vietnam 2022 was the 2nd edition of the Miss World Vietnam pageant. It was held on August 12, 2022, at Merry Land, Quy Nhơn, Bình Định, Vietnam. Miss World Vietnam 2019 Lương Thùy Linh crowned her successor Huỳnh Nguyễn Mai Phương at the end of the event.

The pageant crowned the Vietnam representative to compete at Miss World 2023.

Results

Placements
Color keys

§: People's Choice winner

Special Awards

Challenge events

Beauty With a Purpose
 228 – Lê Nguyễn Bảo Ngọc won Beauty With a Purpose and automatically placed into Top 5

People's Choice
 088 – Nguyễn Thị Lệ Nam Em won People's Choice (Final) and automatically placed into Top 10

Multimedia
 088 – Nguyễn Thị Lệ Nam Em won Multimedia and automatically placed into Top 20

Top Model
 228 – Lê Nguyễn Bảo Ngọc won Top Model and automatically placed into Top 20

Miss Tourism
 104 – Nguyễn Thị Phương Linh won Miss Tourism and automatically placed into Top 20 

(§): Withdrew for health issues

Beach Beauty
 516 – Nguyễn Khánh My won Beach Beauty and automatically placed into Top 20

Miss Talent
 216 – Huỳnh Nguyễn Mai Phương won Miss Talent and automatically placed into Top 20

Miss Sports
 018 – Phan Lê Hoàng An won Miss Sports and automatically placed into Top 20

Head-to-Head Challenge
 182 - Nguyễn Thùy Linh won Head-to-Head Challenge and automatically placed into Top 20

Queen Talks
 216 - Huỳnh Nguyễn Mai Phương won Queen Talks

Contestants

Top 38 contestants in the final round

Top 45 contestants in the preliminary

Top 66 contestants in the preliminary

Judges
Trần Hữu Việt - Journalist and poet
Hà Kiều Anh - Actress and Miss Vietnam 1992
Trần Tiểu Vy - Miss Vietnam 2018
Lương Thùy Linh - Miss World Vietnam 2019
Vũ Lệ Quyên - Singer
Lê Ngọc Minh Hằng - Singer and actress
Karolina Bielawska - Miss World 2021 from Poland
Nguyễn Thúc Thùy Tiên - Miss Grand International 2021 from Vietnam

References

Beauty pageants in Vietnam
2022 beauty pageants
Vietnamese awards